A spermatophylax is a gelatinous bolus which some male insects eject during copulation with females through their aedeagi together with spermatophores, and which functions as a nutritive supplement for the female.

See also
Nuptial gift

References

Insect anatomy
Sexual anatomy